The Putney Sculpture Trail encompasses nine sculptures by the British sculptor Alan Thornhill which are permanently publicly sited along the south side of the River Thames to either side of Putney Bridge, in the London Borough of Wandsworth.

They are located between Leader's Gardens to the west and Prospect Quay/Riverside Quarter to the east – a distance of approximately one mile. The first sculpture, Load, was unveiled in 1989. The others were publicly launched on 14 September 2008.

References

External links
Sculpture Trail map

Sculpture gardens, trails and parks in the United Kingdom
River Thames
Buildings and structures in the London Borough of Wandsworth
Tourist attractions in the London Borough of Wandsworth
Outdoor sculptures in London
Putney